Tadeusz Żuliński may refer to:
 Tadeusz Żuliński (veterinarian) (1910–1967), Polish veterinarian, anatomicopathologist
 Tadeusz Żuliński (activist) (1889–1915), Polish activist